Ricardian socialism is a branch of classical economic thought based upon the work of the economist David Ricardo (1772–1823). The term is used to describe economists in the 1820s and 1830s who developed a theory of capitalist exploitation from the theory developed by Ricardo that stated that labor is the source of all wealth and exchange value. This principle extends back to the principles of English philosopher John Locke. The Ricardian socialists reasoned that labor is entitled to all it produces, and that rent, profit and interest were not natural outgrowths of the free market process but were instead distortions. They argued that private ownership of the means of production should be supplanted by cooperatives owned by associations of workers.

This designation is used in reference to economists in the early 19th century that elaborated a theory of capitalist exploitation from the classical economic proposition derived from Adam Smith and David Ricardo stating that labor is the source of wealth. Although Ricardian socialist thought had some influence on Karl Marx's theories, there is disagreement about the extent to which this is the case. Some believe Marx rejected many of the fundamental assumptions of the Ricardian socialists, including the view that labor was the source of all wealth; while others believe the Ricardian socialists, though "generally dismissed as incoherent utopians", were in fact "an important though very largely neglected" influence on Marxist economic theories.

Economics 
Ricardian socialism is considered to be a form of socialism based on the arguments made by Ricardo that the equilibrium value of commodities approximated producer prices when those commodities were in elastic supply, that these producer prices corresponded to the embodied labor and that profit, interest and rent were deductions from this exchange-value. This is deduced from the axiom of Ricardo and Adam Smith that labor is the source of all value.

The first imputation that early British and Irish socialists were influenced by Ricardo is made by Karl Marx in his 1846 Poverty of Philosophy: Anyone who is in any way familiar with the trend of political economy in England cannot fail to know that almost all the Socialists in that country have, at different periods, proposed the equalitarian application of the Ricardian theory. We quote for M. Proudhon: Hodgskin, Political Economy, 1827; William Thompson, An Inquiry into the Principles of the Distribution of Wealth Most Conducive to Human Happiness, 1824; T. R. Edmonds, Practical Moral and Political Economy, 1828 [18], etc., etc., and four pages more of etc. We shall content ourselves with listening to an English Communist, Mr. Bray. We shall give the decisive passages in his remarkable work, Labor's Wrongs and Labor's Remedy, Leeds, 1839...

The link is later re-asserted by Herbert Foxwell in his introduction to the English translation of Anton Menger's "The Right to the Whole Produce of Labor" (1899). Consequently, the category of Ricardian socialist came to be accepted by supporters and opponents both of Marxism by the early 20th century.

However, in recent years a number of scholars have challenged the validity of the category based on the lack of evidence that its proposed members had either read Ricardo's "Principles of Political Economy" or the contradictory internal evidence of their own value theory which appears to owe more to Adam Smith than Ricardo. So much so that several scholars prefer the term "Smithian Socialism".

Ricardian socialists 

 Thomas Hodgskin
 Charles Hall
 John Francis Bray
 John Gray
 William Thompson
 Percy Ravenstone

See also 

 Classical economics
 David Ricardo
 Free-market anarchism
 Labor theory of value
 Mutualism
 Market socialism
 Piero Sraffa
 Ricardian economics
 Socialist economics

References

Bibliography

External links 
 "Utopians and Socialists", History of Economic Thought, New School for Social Research

Eponymous economic ideologies
Market socialism
Classical economics
Eponymous political ideologies
Types of socialism